Teresa Coady (born July 1956) is a Canadian architect and the former  president and founding partner of the Vancouver, British Columbia-based architecture firm B+H BuntingCoady (now part of B+H Architects).  She is a member of the Canadian Chapter of the International Initiative for a Sustainabie Built Environment and a member of the  United Nations Environment Programme Advisory Board. She is the author of Rebuilding Earth: Designing Ecoconscious Habitats for Humans.

Life and career
Teresa Coady received her degree in Architecture in 1983 from the University of British Columbia. She is best known for her architectural work in the area of sustainability and energy-efficient design.  In 1993, Teresa Coady and Tom Bunting founded Bunting Coady Architects; the practice was renamed in 2010 to B+H BuntingCoady Architects Inc. Coady  completed two years of engineering and received a bachelor of fine arts prior to pursuing a master's degree in Architecture.

The statement “We create Living, Breathing Buildings”, which is trademarked by B+H BuntingCoady, developed from Coady’s master thesis entitled "The Living Breathing Building". Coady sites her thesis project "The Living Breathing Building" as the mechanism though which her architectural values came to light. While her thesis was initially rejected for being ‘not architectural’, the principles associated with the phrase “Living, Breathing Buildings” became the founding values upon which Bunting Coady Architects was initially created and upon which B+H BuntingCoady operates.

Coady believes that architecture is the means through which humans express cultural values and through which humans can prepare themselves for the future. The creation of architecture, for Coady, can have an enormous impact on the planet:

In her opinion, the concept of  “Living, Breathing Building” is synonymous with a move away from the notion that buildings should be built as machines for inhabitation and towards biomimetics (the art and science of using nature and natural systems as the source of inspiration for creating buildings and building systems).  A “Living, Breathing Building”, according to Coady, is a building that imitates nature and enhances the environment.

The B+H BuntingCoady Integrated Design Process

Teresa Coady is also known for her involvement in the creation and development of the building method utilized by B+H BuntingCoady and referred to as the ‘integrated design process’ (IDP). The B+H BuntingCoady Integrated Design Process is composed of a series of steps that, according to Coady:  “(work) anywhere, anytime on any kind of building”. The phases of this IDP process include: Orientation and Massing Site Design and Water, Envelope, Ventilation, Lighting and Power, Heating and Cooling, Materials, Life-cycle costing, Quality Assurance.

Non-Architectural Work

Teresa Coady is actively involved in the Vancouver Cherry Blossom Festival. The festival encourages the world to visit and celebrate the phenomenon of the massive cherry tree bloom annually every spring in Vancouver.

Individual Awards and Recognition

Teresa Coady was selected as winner of the “Bell Trailblazer” category for the 2008  RBC Canadian Woman Entrepreneur Awards (CWEA). Coady was selected for this award (as described by AIArchitect This Week March 13, 2009), “for (her) outstanding leadership within her company and business sector”  and because “her work is pioneering new ways of creating mainstream architecture that turns away from mechanistic systems to harnessing the ‘natural intelligence’ of buildings for sustainable and energy-efficient designs".

In 1999, Coady was awarded the YWCA Woman of Distinction Award; an  award that honours “women whose outstanding achievements contribute to the well-being and future of (the) community.” She was also included in the 10th Annual Profit W100 list of Canada’s Top Women Entrepreneurs (Published November 2008).

United Nations Environment Programme

In May 2011, Coady was elected to the 2011 UNEP-SBCI Advocacy Committee.
She attended the 2011 UNEP-SBCI Annual General Meeting and Symposium on Sustainable Buildings in Leverkusen, Germany on May 23–24, 2011.

See also
B+H Architects
Biomimetics
Sustainable architecture

References

1956 births
Living people
People from Toronto
Canadian women architects
20th-century Canadian architects
21st-century Canadian architects
20th-century Canadian women writers